John (died 1273) was a Hungarian distinguished nobleman, who served as voivode of Transylvania in 1273, during the reign of Ladislaus IV of Hungary.

References

Sources
 Engel, Pál (2001). The Realm of St Stephen: A History of Medieval Hungary, 895-1526. I.B. Tauris Publishers. .
  Markó, László (2006). A magyar állam főméltóságai Szent Istvántól napjainkig – Életrajzi Lexikon ("The High Officers of the Hungarian State from Saint Stephen to the Present Days – A Biographical Encyclopedia") (2nd edition); Helikon Kiadó Kft., Budapest; .
 Treptow, Kurt W. & Popa, Marcel (1996). Historical Dictionary of Romania. Scarecrow Press, Inc. .
  Zsoldos, Attila (2011). Magyarország világi archontológiája, 1000–1301 ("Secular Archontology of Hungary, 1000–1301"). História, MTA Történettudományi Intézete. Budapest. 

1273 deaths
Voivodes of Transylvania
Medieval Transylvanian people
Year of birth unknown
13th-century Hungarian people